Is He Listening? is the fourth album by Koby Israelite, the last under the Tzadik label.It was recorded and mixed at Bamba Studios in London in 2008.

Track listing
 Joy - 5:48
 Papa Don´t Trill - 5:30
 Easy Listening - 5:34
 Out to Lounge - 5:31
 Shmekeria - 4:31
 Adon Haselichot - 3:42
 Almost There but Not Quite - 3:00
 Under the Apricot Tree - 4:48
 Self Hating Blues - 2:53
 Two Stone Down - 2:15
 Paulina In the Skype - 3:54
 Just Like Everybody Else - 6:15

Personnel
 Koby Israelite
Accordion, Drums, Percussion, Cajón, Guitar, Piano, Keyboards, Mandolin, Bouzouki, Clarinet, Flute, Saxophone Soprano, Bass, Vocals
 Yaron Stavi Bass, Vocals
 Tigran AleksanyanDuduk, Clarinet (tracks 2, 3, 8, 10)
 Michael IsraeliteBass, Dumbek, Vocals (tracks 3, 6)
 Marius ManoleAccordion (tracks 5, 12)
 Ofir GalGuitar (tracks 1, 11)
 Joe TaylorOud (track 6)
 Mor KarbasiVocals (track 6)
 John TelferBaritone Saxophone (track 10)
 Roy ShabatTrumpet (track 11)
 Koby IsraeliteComposition, Production, recording, Mix
 John ZornExecutive Producer
 Scott HullMastering (2)

References

2009 albums
Tzadik Records albums
Koby Israelite albums